Kazka (stylized in all caps;) is a Ukrainian band that performs pop with elements of electro-folk. Since its creation in 2017, vocalist Oleksandra Zaritska, sopilka player Dmytro Mazuriak and multi-instrumentalist Mykyta Budash have become a "breakthrough of the year".

The group's producer and manager is Yuriy Nikitin and the company Mamamusic.

Band history
Kazka emerged on March 1, 2017, with their debut release "Sviata" (Свята), which immediately became a hit in Ukraine. Initially, the band consisted of vocalist Oleksandra Zaritska and multi-instrumentalist Nikita Budash (guitar, keyboard), who also works on arrangement and sound engineering. "Sviata" was also the band's debut video. Serhii Tkachenko directed the video, which is a minimalist work in red shades, featuring the band members and a number of ancient Slavic symbols (Dazhbog, the Star of the Virgin Lada, Zervan, Koliada, the Star of Herest, Bilobog and others).

Participation in X-Factor 
In 2017 the band participated in the casting for Ukraine's X-Factor 8 with their song "Sviata". Andrii Danylko was the band's mentor. Following the results of the viewer voting, the band left the show on the 5th episode. Right after leaving the show, Kazka released the second single "Dyva" (Дива), which on the day of its premiere topped the iTunes chart.

At the end of the year, the band was named "Best Debut of the Year" by online magazine Karabas Live.

In the beginning of 2018, Dmytro Mazuryak, who plays more than 30 wind instruments, joined the band. On January 6, it became known that the band would take part in the national selection for the Eurovision Song Contest. On February 10, Kazka performed in the first semi-final of the selection with the song "Dyva". According to the results of the viewer voting and the jury, Kazka finished sixth and failed to reach the finals.

Karma
On April 27, 2018, the band's debut album Karma (Карма) was released online. The album has ten tracks, three of which were previously released: "Sviata", "Dyva", "Sama" (Сама), "Movchaty" (Мовчати) (a cover of a song by Skryabin and Iryna Bilyk), and six new tracks. The band presented the album live at their first solo show at Kyiv's Atlas Club on June 1. The single "Sviata" was named "Best Pop Band Song" and the band was recognised as "Best Debut" by national radio station Kraina FM. For the first time ever, a Ukrainian-speaking band entered the Global Shazam Top 10. Kazka achieved an absolute record among Ukrainian artists in terms of the number of views and made it to the Top 100 best videos on YouTube. The musicians have been repeatedly awarded with the title "Breakthrough of the Year" and, for the song "Plakala" (Плакала), they received the "Hit of the Year" award and featured in the rating of Ukraine's most popular tracks according to Apple Music. The band has topped the charts in numerous countries, including Ukraine, Latvia, Bulgaria, Armenia, Kazakhstan, Uzbekistan, Belarus, Russia, Colombia, and others. In the summer, Kazka participated in various Ukrainian festivals such as BeLive in Kyiv, Impulse in Kharkiv, and MRPL City in Mariupol. In the autumn, the band launched their national Karma Tour in support of the album. Drummer Ievhen Kostyts and a trio of chorists (Vasylyna Tkachuk, Daryna Salii and Yaryna Sizyk) joined them on the tour. In winter 2018 the band announced an upcoming tour of the United States and Europe in 2019.

"Plakala" 
The band scored a success with the song "Plakala", that hit a couple of records among tracks across the CIS. Kazka has become the first band from the CIS to be ranked 8th in all categories and the 3rd in the world pop category of one of the most prestigious world charts Top 10 Global Shazam. Kazka has become an absolute record holder among the Ukrainian artists in the amount of views and is in Top 100 best music videos on YouTube. The "Plakala" music video has become the first Ukrainian language video to get over 200 million views on YouTube. So far it has been viewed over 411 million times therefore becoming the most viewed in Ukraine in 2018. Kazka has got the "Hit of the Year" award according to M1 Music Awards and has been mentioned in the Apple music rating of the most popular tracks in Ukraine.

Boris Barabanov, summing up the results of 2018, named the song "Plakala" one of 16 best tracks of the past year. He noted that the song became the most popular song on Russian radio stations, and that this is the first Ukrainian language song in many years, which has reached the top of Russian charts.

Nirvana
In April 2019, the band announced via its Facebook page that it was working on a second album. The album is titled Nirvana. The album was released in December 2019.

"Apart" and Vidbir 2019 
In 2019, the band competed in Vidbir 2019 to try and represent Ukraine in the Eurovision Song Contest 2019. In the second semi final that was held on 16 February 2019, they finished 2nd and qualified for the final. The final took place on 23 February 2019. They finished in 3rd place. After the winner and the runner up of the contest rejected the broadcaster's offer to represent Ukraine at Eurovision, Kazka rejected their offer as well.

Svit 
On November 5, 2021, the band released their 3rd studio album - Svit.

Band members 
 Oleksandra Zaritska — lead vocals
 Mykyta Budash — keyboards, guitar
 Dmytro Mazuriak — wind instruments (2018–present)

Discography

Studio albums

Singles

Collaborations 

 2019 — Tua feat. KAZKA «Bedingungslos»
 2019 — KAZKA — Plakala [R3HAB Remix]
 2019 — KAZKA — CRY [with R3HAB]
 2022 — Gogol Bordello & KAZKA — Take Only What You Can Carry
 2022 — Gogol Bordello, KAZKA & Serhiy Zhadan — Forces Of Victory

See also
 Pop music in Ukraine

References

External links 

Biography at Kazka official site  
Oleksandra Zaritska at IMDb

Musical groups established in 2017
Ukrainian pop music groups
Ukrainian electronic musicians
Folktronica musicians
Ukrainian LGBT rights activists
2017 establishments in Ukraine
Musical groups from Kyiv